Sarauw is a surname. Notable people with the surname include: 

Anna Sarauw (1839–1919), Danish textile artist
Georg F.L. Sarauw (1862–1928), Danish-Swedish botanist and archaeologist
Paul Sarauw (1883–1959), Danish screenwriter